A route setter is a person who designs artificial rock climbing wall routes, or problems. Also known as "setters", these professionals combine technical craft with an artistic representation of real rock climbing moves. They do this with modular resin, polyurethane, polyester, fiberglass, or wood holds or "grips" that mimic real rock features. These routes are used by a rock climber to get to the top of a climbing wall.

A “setter” can set routes in many ways, some examples being bouldering, top roping, lead climbing, among other types of climbing. Someone wishing to get training as a route setter can simply take a short workshop in a specific climbing gym and learn the basics in order to set in that particular gym. The limitation is that their skills will only be recognized by that climbing gym only. If they want to route set elsewhere, however, the person may register to a route-setter certification workshop where, depending on the applicant's abilities, one of five grades of route setting can be attained. Usually, the more complex routes the applicant can make, the higher the level of certification.

	The simplest ways on how to set an indoor route are to decide by placement, rocks, and/or themes. Setters tend to stay away from miscellaneous rocks placed randomly on a wall that are not one of the previously mentioned categories. This is because they are difficult to climb, not very enjoyable and are aesthetically unpleasing. Placement is where there is a specific part of the artificial wall the setter wants to work on. This wall could have ‘natural’ features or arêtes that the setter wants to be used when someone works on this route. When the setter chooses by rocks, they might have a specific boulder or boulders that they want to base the route on. Occasionally these specific boulders are the crux of the route. Lastly, the setter can base a bouldering route on theme. A themed boulder route is when the setter uses only boulders of one type such as crimp, sloper, jugs, pocket, etc. The setter can also base the theme on one specific coloring or a brand or anything else that can be common among all boulders the setter chooses. When the setter plans a route make sure that it is in their skill level otherwise they cannot test their own route and possibly not be able to finish setting it. In addition, the route setter must make sure to communicate with the gym manager because they will often need more routes of a specific difficulty or type. Route setting can be done solo or in groups of route setters. The advantage of having more setters is that each setter will climb differently, can be used to test the route, have different arm spans, different strengths and weaknesses with climbing. The problem about having more people is there can be a clash of ideas and efficiency can go down because of this.

	To mount the boulder into the artificial wall the setter will simply have to screw it in with a screwdriver. Securing boulders is easy because the walls are built with holes strategically placed for common boulders to be placed. Boulders have different type of screws based on which type of boulder the company was made by. A setter must be sure to use the proper according screw and screwdriver, otherwise a boulder may not be stable on the wall. Boulders can eventually be pulled off the wall over many uses, and this can result in injury or death. A ladder might be required if the setter cannot reach the next desired place to screw in the boulder. The setter must mark off the area around the route that they are setting at because there might be loose boulders that can falls on people passing by, or a climber does not accidentally climb into or around the incomplete area and possibly get hurt.

	When a setter sets routes for rock climbing, they can also use boulders that are already pre-existing on the wall for their route and not necessarily have to put new ones up. At the start of the route setting, they can either set routes by selecting boulder by boulder or by taping up places where they want each boulder to be placed. Boulder by boulder is typically easier to start setting routes with. After each boulder placement, the setter will want to test the route. This will show if they will need to make any adjustments to any boulders. Possible adjustments could be to rotate the boulder(s) so they are easier/harder to climb and help the continuity of the route. Also, the boulder(s) could be out of reach for climbers or too easy to reach in which the setter would add a smaller foothold for the shorter people or move the boulder, so the route is not as easy respectively.

	After the route is complete, the route setter will have to grade to according to the grading standard system that the climbing gym they are setting in uses. Bouldering typically uses the Hueco system from V0, V1, V2... V16 or the Fontainebleau grading system. Top-roping typically uses the French numerical system or the Yosemite Decimal System (YDS). Once the setter decides the grade, they will tape up the route to show which boulders are allowed to climb when climbing their route. A setter will not have to tape the boulders if they have already taped them up before picking boulders. Typically, the start and finish of the route is marked with two pieces of tape. There can also be squares, crosses or any other shape to keep the beginning and end distinct. After taping the route and writing down the grade and possibly a name of the route, the route will need to be climbed again to double-check if the tape can be seen from each step of the route.

	After everything is complete, it is best to get another climber or climbers to test the setter’s route to see if the other climbers agree with the setter’s marked grade. The climber(s) should be able to climb the difficulty of the marked route before asking them to test it. There will always be climbers who climb the route differently from how the setter has planned to climb it when they set it. This is not wrong, and the setter should not be bias or judge the climber for it. After a few climbers test it, the setter may want to modify the route. Routes are never permanent and always receive changes. Exception is if the route is made for a competition, then it will not be altered until the competition is over. Routes will be removed whenever the climbing gym staff decides to change routes or add more routers or strip the wall and clean it for climbing competitions. At a climbing competition there will be designed route settings who will set from all grade levels and these new routes will typically stay up for a while.

	When a setter is creating routes for top-roping or lead-climbing, it is very similar, except that they will have more vertical space to build on versus horizontal space unlike bouldering. They will need a ladder and/or self-belaying device. When the setter is self-belaying, they can attach a bucket or two onto their harness for stripping then wall of old boulders and/or adding new boulders onto the wall. Route setting for top-roping/lead-climbing can follow the similar techniques listed above, except it is more common to add tape before boulder in this case.

References 

Indoor climbing